The West Branch Wading River is a  tributary of the Wading River in Burlington County in the southern New Jersey Pine Barrens in the United States.

The confluence of Tulpehocken Creek and the West Branch Wading River create the Wading River.

See also
Wharton State Forest
List of rivers of New Jersey

References

External links
U.S. Geological Survey: NJ stream gaging stations

Rivers of Burlington County, New Jersey
Tributaries of the Mullica River
Rivers in the Pine Barrens (New Jersey)
Rivers of New Jersey